Wood River is a river in the Canadian province of Saskatchewan. It has its source in the Wood Mountain Hills of south-western Saskatchewan and flows in a north-easterly direction to its mouth at Old Wives Lake. Old Wives Lake is a salt water lake with no outflow. As a result, the drainage basin of Wood River is an endorheic one. Along the course of the river, there are several parks, historical sites, and small towns.

Course and description 
Wood River begins in south-western Saskatchewan at the height of the Wood Mountain Hills in semi-arid grasslands within a large region called Palliser's Triangle. Much of the northern half of Wood Mountain Hills is in the Wood River watershed while the southern half flows south into the United States and the drainage basin of the Milk River – a tributary of the Missouri River. This part of the drainage divide is known as the Missouri Coteau. Near the small community of Summercove, the river turns north-east and begins to head out of the hills where it is joined by several tributaries. Along the route, south of Gravelbourg, a dam was built that created Thomson Lake. On the eastern shore of the lake is Thomson Lake Regional Park, the oldest regional park in Saskatchewan. After Gravelbourg, the river continues north-east, passes by Shamrock Regional Park, and flows into the western end of Old Wives Lake. Old Wives Lake is part of an Important Bird Area (IBA) of Canada and, along with Reed and Chaplin Lakes, were designated part of the Western Hemisphere Shorebird Reserve Network (WHSRN). Wood River also inspired the famous Canadian folk song by the same name written by Connie Kaldor and sung nationwide by Canadian choirs. The song is considered by many to be the quintessential Saskatchewan song.

Tributaries 
The following are the tributaries of Wood River from its upper watershed in the Wood Mountain Hills to its mouth at Old Wives Lake:
Tetreau Creek
Patriotic Creek
McCrea Creek
Uteck Creek
Kolskeg Creek
McDonald Creek
Gavelin Creek
Six Mile Creek
Sisterbutte Creek
Nine Mile Creek
Ten Mile Creek
Chubey Creek
Flynn Creek
Stephton Creek
Lynthorpe Creek
Wood Mountain Creek
 Gollier Creek
Lafleche Creek
Pinto Creek
Laville Creek
Notukeu Creek
Bull Creek
Russell Creek
Cripple Creek
Wiwa Creek
East Wiwa Creek
Chaplin Creek

Lakes and reservoirs 
There are several notable lakes and reservoirs within the Wood River watershed. Due to the semi-arid conditions in the region of Palliser's Triangle, several reservoirs were built to retain water for irrigation and consumption.
Braddock Reservoir, is along the course of Wiwa Creek
Chaplin Lake, is the source of Chaplin Creek
Midtskogen Lake, is connected to Chaplin Lake
Thomson Lake, is along the course of Wood River
Twelve Mile Lake, is the source of Lynthorpe Creek
Gouverneur Reservoir, is along the course of Notukeu Creek

Shamrock Regional Park 
Shamrock Regional Park is a regional park in the RM of Shamrock No. 134 along the course of Wood River. Founded in 1961, it is one of the oldest regional parks in Saskatchewan. The park is tucked away into a well treed, horseshoe-shaped bend in the river and has amenities such as a campground, swimming pool, picnic area, ball diamonds, fishing, hiking trails, and a 9-hole golf course.

The campground has 100 electric sites and shower and laundry facilities. The golf course, which opened in 1965, has sand greens and winds its way around the river's edge.

Historical sites 
Along the course of the river, there are three Saskatchewan historical sites on the Canadian Register of Historic Places. A fourth site, Eason's Grove, is located on a small bluff north of Gravelbourg in the Wood River Valley that overlooks Wood River. All four sites are within the RM of Gravelbourg No. 104.

Cripple Creek Crossing site 
Cripple Creek Crossing, located at the point where Cripple Creek meets Wood River just south of Old Wives Lake, is the site of a North-West Mounted Police camp during their March West in 1874. By mid-August, the rigours of the difficult trek west left some men in poor health. It was decided to leave seven troopers, five of whom were sick, a Métis employee, and 26 weak horses behind at the camp. The camp was dubbed "cripple camp". They stayed there until  Commissioner George French returned in early October on his way back east. Today, the historical site consists of 128 hectares of fields and pasture land.

Trapper's Cabin site 
Trapper's Cabin, located near Gravelbourg, is the only surviving trapper's cabin in the area from the fur trade.

The 32-hectare site has the remains of a small dugout shelter on the banks of Wood River that was built in the 1930s by Norman Poulin, a local Métis farmer and trapper. Poulin used trapping to supplement his farm income during the Great Depression and it is one of five such shelters he built to operate his trapline along the river.

Wamsley Bridge site 
The site shows evidence of butchering and processing by pre-contact First Nations over many years.

Eason's Grove site 
Eason's Grove was an unofficial recreation site that had no level of formal government organisation. From about 1907, local residents began using the area as a picnic spot and gathering site due to the natural grassy field, groves of trees, and access to Woody River. Eventually ball diamonds were constructed on the south side of the property and pick-up games were played. Use of the park started to decline by the 1960s as other government organised parks began opening up. It was officially closed in 1970 and was converted to pasture land.

See also 
List of rivers of Saskatchewan
Hudson Bay drainage basin
Tourism in Saskatchewan
History of Saskatchewan
List of endorheic basins
Woody River, a river of a similar name in eastern Saskatchewan and western Manitoba

References 

Rivers of Saskatchewan
Rodgers No. 133, Saskatchewan
Wood River No. 74, Saskatchewan
Gravelbourg No. 104, Saskatchewan
Mankota No. 45, Saskatchewan
Waverley No. 44, Saskatchewan
North-West Mounted Police